The Montmorency River is a tributary of North-East bank of St. Lawrence river, flowing in the administrative region of Capitale-Nationale, in the province of Quebec, Canada. The course of the river successively crosses the regional county municipality of:
MRC La Côte-de-Beaupré Regional County Municipality: Lac-Jacques-Cartier, Château-Richer, L'Ange-Gardien, Boischatel;
MRC La Jacques-Cartier Regional County Municipality: Sainte-Brigitte-de-Laval
Agglomération de Québec.

It is especially known for the impressive Montmorency Falls near its mouth.

Geography

The Montmorency River flows from Lake Montmorency in a southerly direction through the undeveloped Canadian Shield of the Laurentides Wildlife Reserve. Thereafter, it passes through the municipalities of Sainte-Brigitte-de-Laval, Beauport, and Boischatel, where the course of the river is characterized by the presence of numerous rapids before plunging  over the Montmorency Falls.

The river's watershed basin is sparsely populated, 92% of it is forested and dotted with 424 lakes. Urban and agricultural land makes up only 2% and 1% of the basin respectively, and is mostly confined to a small section in the far south of the Saint Lawrence lowlands.

The municipalities and unorganized territories that cover the Montmorency basin are:

Tributaries
The larger tributaries of the Montmorency River are (downstream default sorting order):

Course of the Montmorency river 

  towards the south-west, in particular by crossing Lac Subulé, collecting the outlet (coming from the east) of Lac Alyse, crossing two marsh zones, to the outlet (coming from the northwest) of Lac Montmorency;
  to the south by collecting a stream (coming from the northeast), up to the outlet (coming from the southeast) of Lac Lachance;
  to the south by collecting the discharge (coming from the east) from Lac Absolon, by bending towards the west to a bend corresponding to the confluence of the Brûlés stream (coming from the west);
  to the south, collecting Murphy Creek (coming from the east), then slightly southwest to a bend in the river where the course goes to the south- east along route 175, then across the Marre du Sault on its full length to the dam located at its mouth. Note: The outlet of Lac Provençal is discharged on the northeast bank of the Mare du Sault;
  towards the south-east by collecting the discharge (coming from the south) from Lac Forestier, the discharge (coming from the north) from Lac Élois, the discharge (coming from the south) from Lac Pasquin, the outlet (coming from the northeast) from Lac Laflamme, the outlet (coming from the west) from Lac Piché, to the Noire River (coming from the North). Note: In the last  of this segment, the course of the river crosses the Montmorency Forest;

  south in a deep valley of the Montmorency Forest, to the Blanche River (coming from the northeast);
  towards the south in a deep valley and bending, of which the first  in Montmorency Forest, towards the east to the stream of the North (coming from the south);
  towards the east in a deep valley, until the confluence of the rivière des Neiges (coming from the north);

Intermediate course of the Montmorency river, downstream from the Rivière des Neiges (segment of )

  towards the south-east in a deep valley by collecting the Cauchon stream (coming from the north), then bending towards the south, until the confluence of the Smith River (coming from the east);
  in a deep valley to the south passing in front of "Le Club-Banc-de-Sable" and "Le Grand-Club", collecting the Swain stream (coming from the west) and Jos-Bédard stream (coming from the east), up to a bend corresponding to the confluence of the Rouge river (coming from the east);
  in a deep valley towards the west, then the southwest by collecting the stream of Déboulis (coming from the west), the stream of the Beaver (coming from the east); by bending towards the southeast by collecting the Brebel stream (coming from the northeast); south by collecting Verret stream (coming from the east); then south-west to the confluence of the Rivière à l'Île (coming from the northwest);
  towards the south while bending towards the south-west to bypass the "Montagne Thomassin", until the confluence of the Richelieu River (coming from the northwest) located in the heart of Sainte-Brigitte-de-Laval;
  to the south by crossing a series of rapids, until the confluence of the Rivière aux Pins (coming from the west);

Lower course of the Montmorency river (segment of )

  towards the south by first forming a curve towards the east, then towards the southwest, until the confluence of the Euclid stream (coming from the west), ie in the hamlet Moulin-Vallière. Note: The east bank of this segment is located at the foot of the steep cliff of a mountain whose highest peak reaches , while the west bank is inhabited;
  towards the south-east, in particular by bypassing Île Enchanteresse (hamlet of L'Île-Enchanteresse) and three other islands, until the confluence of the Rivière du Lac (coming from the west);
  towards the south-east by forming a large detour towards the north to bypass the hamlet "Les Trois-Saults" and crossing on  an area of rapids which ends in the south-west of the hamlet "Les Hauts-Bois-de-la-Montmorency", up to the confluence of the Ferrée river (coming from the northeast);
  to the east, forming a large S, crossing the Barrage des Marches Naturelles and passing under the bridge of the route 360, until Montmorency Falls;
  towards the south-east by crossing the Sugar Loaf Basin and passing under the railway bridge, until its mouth corresponding to the bridges of the highway 40.

The Montmorency River flows on the northwest bank of the Saint-Laurent River via the Île d'Orléans Channel. This confluence is located opposite the Île-d'Orléans Bridge and downstream from Old Quebec.

History

In 1608, Samuel de Champlain visited the falls at the mouth of the river and named it le grand saut de Montmorency ("the great falls of Montmorency") in honour of Charles de Montmorency (1537–1612), to whom Champlain had dedicated his explorations. The name of the falls came to be applied to the whole river, as the 1641 map by Jean Bourdon showed it as "Saut de Montmorency".

French colonization along the Montmorency River initially occurred at the mouth and falls only. The town of Boischatel was settled circa 1664.

In 1759, the Montmorency River formed a major obstacle to English General James Wolfe that prevented him from invading Quebec City from the east and subsequently forced him to scale the cliffs west of the city and battle the French on the Plains of Abraham. Remnants of an earthen fort built by Wolfe can still be found on the east side of the falls.

In the 19th century, colonization and logging of the interior really took off, and settlers came to the Sainte-Brigitte-de-Laval area in 1830. The river was used for log driving and its shores became industrialized when a hydro-electric dam and sawmill were built at the top and foot of the Montmorency Falls respectively. After the logging period ended, textile industry developed at the mouth of the river.

In 1992, the area surrounding the falls and mouth of the river was made into a park and developed for tourism with new viewing platforms, stairs, pedestrian bridge, aerial tram, restaurant, and visitor's centre.

Development and use

There are 48 dams in all on the Montmorency River and its tributaries. Of these, 14 are used to regulate water flow, five to provide drinking water, and only one is used exclusively for hydro-electric power generation. The Hydro-Québec power station at the Montmorency Falls is no longer in operation, but not far upstream is the Marches-Naturelles Hydro-electric Power Station. It has an installed capacity of 4.16 MW.

All municipalities along its course rely on the Montmorency or tributaries for its drinking water supply. Only Sainte-Brigitte-de-Laval treats its waste waters before pumping it back into the Montmorency. Boischatel and Beauport put their waste water into the Saint Lawrence River. The municipalities of L’Ange-Gardien, Château-Richer, Lac-Beauport, Stoneham-et-Tewkesbury do not impact the water quality of the Montmorency since their population centres lie outside the rivers basin, and therefore the water quality is very good.

A total of 76 bridges cross the Montmorency River. Of these, only 3 are public road bridges: Quebec Route 40, Avenue Royale between Beauport and Boischatel, and one at Enchanteresse Island.

Fauna
The four most dominant fish species within the Montmorency basin are the rainbow trout, lake trout, Arctic char, and especially brook trout. Other species include the longnose sucker, white sucker, slimy sculpin, and pearl dace.

There are two species of reptiles: common garter snake and red-bellied snake. In addition, there are eight species of amphibians: American toad, wood frog, green frog, spring peeper, red-backed salamander, dusky salamander, northern two-lined salamander, and eastern newt.

Toponymy 
The explorer Samuel de Champlain named the fall located near the mouth of this watercourse "le grand saut de Montmorency" (English: "the big jump of Montmorency") on his map of 1608. Subsequently, the name of this fall attributed to the river. The map of Jean Bourdon, dated approximately 1641, indicates / Rivière Saut de Montmorency ". This toponymic designation evokes the memory of a member of the illustrious house of Montmorency, Charles de Montmorency (1537-1612), lord of Méru, Duke of Damville and admiral of France and Brittany, to whom Champlain had dedicated his exploration account of 1603.

The toponym "Montmorency river" was formalized on December 5, 1968 at the Commission de toponymie du Québec.

References

External links

 Conseil de bassin de la rivière Montmorency

See also
St. Lawrence River
La Côte-de-Beaupré Regional County Municipality
Lac-Jacques-Cartier, an unorganized territory
Château-Richer, a municipality
L'Ange-Gardien, a municipality
Boischatel, a municipality
La Jacques-Cartier Regional County Municipality
Sainte-Brigitte-de-Laval, a municipality
Agglomération de Québec.
Montmorency Forest
Ferrée River, a tributary
Rouge River, a tributary
Smith River, a tributary
Blanche River, a tributary
Noire River, a tributary
Rivière des Neiges, a tributary
Rivière du Lac, a tributary
Rivière aux Pins, a tributary
Richelieu River, a tributary
Rivière à l'Île, a tributary
Montmorency Falls
Chenal de l'Île d'Orléans
List of rivers of Quebec

Rivers of Capitale-Nationale
Laurentides Wildlife Reserve